Rio-Sul Serviços Aéreos Regionais S/A was a regional airline headquartered in Rio de Janeiro, Brazil, operating scheduled services to southern Brazil. Its main base was Congonhas Domestic Airport (CGH), São Paulo, with hubs at Porto Alegre Airport (POA) and Santos Dumont Airport, Rio de Janeiro.

History 
On November 11, 1975 the Brazilian Federal Government created the Brazilian Integrated System of Regional Air Transportation and divided the country in five different regions, for which five newly created regional airlines received a concession to operate air services. RIO-SUL Serviços Aéreos Regionais S/A was the fourth of those regional airlines to be made operational. Founded on August 24, 1976, Rio Sul had its services start on September 8, 1976. Its operational area comprised roughly the Southern and parts of the Southeast regions of Brazil, specifically the states of Rio Grande do Sul, Santa Catarina, Paraná, Rio de Janeiro, and parts of São Paulo, and Espírito Santo.

The airline was originally formed by Top Táxi Aéreo, Bradesco Bank, Atlântica-Boavista Insurance, and Varig.

In 2002 the administration of Rio Sul (which included its former subsidiary Nordeste) were merged with Varig. The brand Rio Sul was part of the assets sold as VRG Linhas Aéreas although its debts remained under the judicial entity Viação Aérea Rio-Grandense, which uses the brand name Flex Linhas Aéreas. As a result of accumulated debts around BRL10 billion (US$5,7 billion, EUR4,5 billion), on August 20, 2010, at the request of the administrator, the 1st Business Court of Rio de Janeiro declared Flex, which included remaining assets of Rio-Sul, bankrupt and initiated the process of liquidation.

Services 

Rio Sul Serviços Aéreos Regionais operated services to the following scheduled domestic destinations (at January 2005): Caxias do Sul, Belo Horizonte, Brasília, Londrina, Maringá, Passo Fundo, São Paulo and Vitória.

Historical Fleet 

The Rio Sul Serviços Aéreos Regionais fleet consisted of the following aircraft:

Incidents and accidents 
According to the Aviation Safety Network's database, Rio Sul Serviços Aéreos Regionais has never experienced a fatal accident in its 26-year-history, though four hull-losses have occurred:

 On May 22, 1982, an Embraer EMB 110 Bandeirante (registration PT-GKC) crashed into a mangrove swamp short of Hercílio Luz International Airport, due to poor visibility. All four people on board survived. The aircraft was damaged beyond repair and written off.
 On August 6, 1984, a Fokker F27 Friendship (registration PT-LCZ) over shot the runway at Santos Dumont Airport. All seven occupants survived, but the aircraft was damaged beyond repair and written off.
 On July 25, 1987, an Embraer EMB 110 Bandeirante (registration PT-GKT) overshot the runway at Santo Angelo Airport. All 13 passengers and crew survived, but the aircraft was damaged beyond repair and written off.
 On December 29, 1998, Rio Sul Flight 310, an Embraer ERJ-145 (registration PT-SPE), was damaged beyond repair when it made a hard landing at Afonso Pena International Airport. All 40 passengers and crew on board survived. Investigators determined that engine power had been reduced just before landing. The aircraft was written off.
There were no fatalities. Despite substantial damage, the aircraft was repaired and returned to service. However, nearly 12 years later, exactly the same aircraft would crash in Russia, killing everyone on board.

See also 
List of defunct airlines of Brazil

References

Bibliography

External links 

Rio Sul Serviços Aéreos Regionais (Archive) (1998–2000)
Rio Sul Serviços Aéreos Regionais (Archive) (1997)
Rio Sul Serviços Aéreos Regionais  (Archive) (1998–2000)
Rio Sul Serviços Aéreos Regionais  (Archive) (1997)
Rio Sul Serviços Aéreos Regionais Fleet Detail

Varig
Defunct airlines of Brazil
Airlines established in 1976
Airlines disestablished in 2002
1976 establishments in Brazil
Former Star Alliance affiliate members